Marjorie Olive Hayward (14 August 188510 January 1953) was an English violinist and violin teacher, prominent during the first few decades of the 20th century.

Biography 
Marjorie Hayward was born in Greenwich in 1885.  An "infant prodigy", her violin studies were with Émile Sauret at the Royal Academy of Music in London (1897–1903), and Otakar Ševčík in Prague (1903–06).

She had early successes in the concerto repertoire, performing in Prague, Berlin (where she played Ethel Smyth's Concerto for Violin, Horn and Orchestra with Aubrey Brain), Paris, Amsterdam and the Hague, but later focussed mainly on chamber music.

She was  the dedicatee of John Ireland's short 1911 piece for violin and piano titled Bagatelle.  She and the composer premiered his Violin Sonata No. 1 in D minor on 7 March 1913 at a Thomas Dunhill Chamber Concert at Steinway Hall.

She led the English String Quartet (which included Frank Bridge on viola), and later the Virtuoso Quartet, the first chamber music group formed specifically for making recordings, with Edwin Virgo (2nd violin), Raymond Jeremy (viola) and its founder Cedric Sharpe (cello).  The Quartet did not confine itself to recordings but also broadcast and toured frequently, its repertoire extending to quintets with artists such as Harriet Cohen, William Murdoch, Arnold Bax and Léon Goossens.

Marjorie Hayward also created her own ensemble, the Marjorie Hayward String Quartet, with Irene Richards (2nd violin), Anatol Mines (viola) and May Mukle (cello).  And there was the English Ensemble, with May Mukle, Rebecca Clarke (viola), and Kathleen Long (piano). Other groups in which she played a prominent role were the English Ensemble Piano Quartet and the Kamaran Trio. The latter was formed in 1937, with the cellist Antonia Butler and the pianist Kathleen Markwell.

Marjorie Hayward was a frequent face at The Proms, playing there 26 times between 1909 and 1944. At a Proms concert on 28 September 1920 she premiered the Violin Concerto in E minor, Op. 33 by York Bowen.  Other works she played at the Proms included:

 Bach (Double Concerto; Concerto in E)
 Brahms (Double Concerto)
 Haydn (Concerto No. 4 in G)
 Paul Juon (Episodes concertantes, Op. 45)
 Mozart (Concertos Nos. 5, 6)
 Saint-Saëns (Concerto No. 3; Introduction and Rondo capriccioso)

and the concertos by Beethoven and Mendelssohn.

She was a Fellow of the RAM, and became a Professor there in 1924.  The RAM's Marjorie Hayward Award is named in her honour.

She married R. G. K. (Rudolf Gustav Karl) Lempfert CBE (b. 1875), Director of the Meteorological Office and in 1930–31 President of the Royal Meteorological Society. Their daughter, Marjorie Lempfert, studied at the RAM, becoming a distinguished viola player and, like her mother, a professor at the Academy.

Marjorie Hayward died in London on 10 January 1953, aged 67.

Recordings 

There are many recordings of Marjorie Hayward's playing:
 abridged versions of Beethoven's "Kreutzer" Sonata, and the Franck and the Elgar sonatas, with Una Bourne
 sonatas by Mozart (K. 378) and Grieg (No. 3 in C minor, Op. 45)
 Purcell, Sonata in G minor, Z. 780, with Madame Adami
 Mozart: Violin Sonata, K.378, 1. Allegro
 a series of Lecture Illustrations with Sir Walford Davies
 Franck, String Quartet, Virtuoso String Quartet
 Saint-Saëns, Piano Quartet in B flat, Op.41 – Scherzo (with Mark Hambourg, piano; Frank Bridge, viola; C. Warwick-Evans, cello)
 Beethoven, E flat Quartet, Op.127, Virtuoso Quartet
 Dittersdorf, Minuet in E flat
 Mozart, "L'amerò, sarò costante", from Il re pastore, with Elisabeth Schumann
 There were also recordings of shorter works by Braga, D'Ambrosio, Fibich, Hubay, Kennedy-Fraser, Marcello, Mendelssohn, Poldini, Raff, Schumann, Simonetti, Stean, Tchaikovsky and Thomé.

She can be heard in the following YouTube links:
  with Madame Adami
  (heavily abridged; with Una Bourne)
 
 
 , accompanying Elsie Suddaby, with Reginald Paul, piano
 , Virtuoso String Quartet, with John Cockerell, harp; Robert Murchie, flute; Charles Draper, clarinet

References 

1885 births
1953 deaths
English classical violinists
Alumni of the Royal Academy of Music
Academics of the Royal Academy of Music
Fellows of the Royal Academy of Music
Violin pedagogues
Women classical violinists
20th-century English women musicians
Women music educators
20th-century classical violinists